Dagsnytt Atten ("Day's news eighteen") is a daily news magazine from Norwegian radio station NRK P2. Broadcast every weekday at 18:00, the programme hosts discussions and debates on the topics of the day featuring politicians and other Norwegian figures. Dagsnytt Atten is broadcast on NRK P2 and NRK Alltid nyheter. The programme has also been broadcast on NRK2 television since 2007, when television cameras were installed in the radio studio and in the control room. When guests appear by phone, a photograph of the person is usually displayed for the television audience. Although it is a radio programme, Dagsnytt Atten has a larger audience on TV than on radio. It had about 100,000 viewers a day on TV in 2015 and around 60,000 listeners on radio.

Lasting one hour, Dagsnytt 18 is part of the Dagsnytt's magazine department. The program was launched in 1990 as Atten Tretti ("Eighteen Thirty", or "6:30 PM") and changed its name to Dagsnytt Atten in 1992.

Current and past hosts
Lars-Jacob Krogh
Johan Sigmunn Hebnes
Hans-Wilhelm Steinfeld
Alf Hartgen
Sverre Tom Radøy
Sigrid Sollund
Eva Nordlund
Lilly Fritzman
Kai Sibbern
Christer Gilje
Marte Michelet
Frithjof Jacobsen
Ole Reinert Omvik
Erik Aasheim
Tomm Kristiansen
Tor Øystein Vaaland
Anne Grosvold

External links
About the program

NRK radio programs
NRK original programming
News radio programs
1990 radio programme debuts
1990 establishments in Norway